Marinone is an antibiotic made by marine actinomycetes.

Biosynthesis 
The proposed biosynthesis of marinone was first reported by George et al. The biosynthesis of marinone begins with THN, which is known to be biosynthesized via the condensation of five malonyl-coenzyme A units followed by the aromatization of the resulting pentaketide using a type III polyketide synthase. Next, THN undergoes geranylation or farnesylation at the C-4 position, yielding 1 (Fig. 1). This transformation is catalyzed in vivo by NphB aromatic prenyltransferase in naphterpin biosynthesis or by CnqP3 or CnqP4 in marinone biosynthesis. Then, 1 undergoes oxidative dearomatization which is catalyzed by VCPO, which is a vanadium-dependent chloroperoxidase enzyme. This transformation yields compound 2. Compound 2 then undergoes two consecutive chlorinations at the C2 position, catalyzed by VCPO, to yield 4. Next, a VCPO catalyzed α-hydroxyketone rearrangement shifts the geranyl substituent from C-4 to C-3, yielding 5. Exposure of 5 to mildly basic conditions induces cyclization to yield the α-chloroepoxide, 6. This is followed by the reductive halogenation of the α-chloroepoxide to yield the hydroxynaphthoquinone, 7. Next, oxidation at the C-2 position and facile E/Z isomerization of the double bond affords the enone, 8, which undergoes a intramolecular hetero-Diels-Alder to yield debromomarinone. Lastly, the vanadium-dependent bromoperoxidase catalyzes the bromination of debromomarinone at the C-5 position to result in the formation of marinone.

References

External links 
 Bioactive compounds from marine actinomycetes

Antibiotics
Angucyclines
Heterocyclic compounds with 4 rings
Bromoarenes
Oxygen heterocycles